Smiling Bears: A Zookeeper Explores the Behavior and Emotional Life of Bears is a 2009 book by Canadian writer Else Poulsen, first published by Greystone Books. In the book, the author chronicles her insights gleaned as a zookeeper responsible for rehabilitating "bears in crisis". Jeffrey Moussaieff Masson called Smiling Bears "An inspiring trip into the minds and reality of bears."

Awards and honours
Smiling Bears received shortlist recognition for the 2010 "Edna Staebler Award for Creative Non-Fiction".

See also
List of Edna Staebler Award recipients

References

External links
Else Poulsen, Home page. Retrieved 23 November 2012

Canadian travel books
2009 non-fiction books
Books about bears